Budec (fl. 1066–1070) was an 11th-century župan of Bribir, and the first known member of the Šubić noble family (later the Zrinski's). He also served at the court of King Peter Krešimir IV of Croatia as a postelnic (a type of chamberlain).

See also
Šubić family tree

References

External links
Zlatni vijek Bribira 

11th-century Croatian people
Medieval Croatian nobility
11th-century Croatian nobility